West Green may refer to:

 West Green, a portion of the campus of Ohio University
 West Green, West Sussex, England
 West Green, Hampshire, England
 West Green, London, England
 West Green, Georgia, United States
 West Green (RTA Rapid Transit station), Shaker Heights, Ohio